is a Japanese agricultural machinery manufacturing company. Its products include tractors, combine harvesters, rice transplanters and tillers.

Headquartered in Higashiizumo, Shimane, Japan, Mitsubishi Agricultural Machinery is a part of the Mitsubishi Group, was established in February 1980 from the merger of the Mitsubishi Machinery Co., Ltd. and Satoh Agricultural Machinery Mfg. Co., Ltd.

Mitsubishi equipment is distributed throughout Asia, Europe Australia and North America. Mitsubishi tractors were sold in the United States for a short period, as Satoh tractors but the current distribution is done under the Mahindra brand by the respective companies. Grey market tractors are also currently sold in the US.  Mitsubishi used to be distributed in the USA under the Cub Cadet and International Harvester brands.

Mitsubishi has partnerships with LS Tractors of South Korea, a division of LS Cable, formerly LG Cable and VST Tillers of India.

Tractors 
Small  diesel tractors

The K3x engines range from the 0.773L K3A rated at 15 hp. to the 1.496L K3M rated at 30 hp.

K3A - 0.773L - 15hp
 
K3B - 0.847L - 17hp
 
K3C - 0.899L - 18.5hp

K3D - 0.978L - 22hp
 
K3E - 1.061L - 24hp
 
K3F - 1.117L - 25hp
 
K3G - 1.235L - 23hp
 
K3H - 1.289L - 25hp
 
K3M - 1.496 - 30hp

External links
Mitsubishi Agricultural Machinery
List of Mitsubishi Tractors
Mitsubishi companies
Agricultural machinery manufacturers of Japan
Tractor manufacturers of Japan
Agriculture in Japan
Japanese brands